Michael G. McKee (born June 18, 1969) is a Canadian businessman and former professional ice hockey defenceman.

Early life and education 
McKee was born in Toronto, Ontario. He earned a Bachelor of Arts degree from Princeton University and a Master of Business Administration from Harvard Business School in 1999.

Career 
McKee was drafted out of Princeton University by the Quebec Nordiques in the 1990 NHL Supplemental Draft. He played 48 games in the National Hockey League with the Nordiques in the 1993–94 season, scoring three goals and adding twelve assists including scoring his first goal against Wayne Gretzky.

After retiring from professional hockey, McKee worked as a senior vice president at PTC and CFO of HighWired.com. He was previously an analyst at Broadview Associates, McKinsey & Company, and Goldman Sachs. In 2021, he became the president of Dotmatics.

Personal life 
McKee has four children and lives in Newton, Massachusetts.

Career statistics

Regular season and playoffs

Awards and honors

References

External links

1969 births
Living people
Canadian ice hockey defencemen
Cornwall Aces players
Greensboro Monarchs players
Halifax Citadels players
Harvard Business School alumni
National Hockey League supplemental draft picks
Princeton Tigers men's ice hockey players
Quebec Nordiques draft picks
Quebec Nordiques players
Ice hockey people from Toronto